This is a list of rider records in the 500cc/MotoGP class of the Grand Prix motorcycle racing, since 1949. Riders set to compete in the 2023 MotoGP World Championship are highlighted in bold.

This page is accurate as of the 2022 Valencian Grand Prix.

Races entered and started
Riders are considered to be entered into a race if they attempt to compete in at least one official practice session with the intent of entering the race. These drivers are noted on the entry list for that race. A rider is considered to have started a race if he lines up on the grid or at the pitlane exit for the start of the race. If a race is stopped and restarted, participation in any portion of the race is counted, but only if that portion was in any way counted towards the final classification.

Total entries

Total starts

Most consecutive race entries

Most consecutive race starts

Most races with a single motorcycle manufacturer

Wins

Total wins

Percentage wins

Percentage wins (minimum 15 starts)

Most wins in a season

Highest percentage of wins in a season

Most consecutive wins

Most wins in the same Grand Prix

Most consecutive wins in the same Grand Prix

Most wins in the same circuit

Most consecutive wins in the same circuit

Most consecutive seasons with a Grand Prix win

Most Grand Prix wins by riders that have not won a World Championship

Most wins in first championship season

Youngest winners
(only the first win for each rider is listed)

Oldest winners
(only the last win for each rider is listed)

Most races before first win

Most races without a win

Podium finishes

Total podium finishes

Percentage podium finishes (minimum 15 races)

Most podium finishes in a season

Most consecutive podium finishes

Most consecutive podium finishes from first race of season

Youngest riders to score a podium finish
(only the first podium finish for each rider is listed)

Most career podium finishes without a World Championship

Most career podium finishes without a win

Most races before scoring a podium finish

Most seasons with a podium finish

Most consecutive seasons with a podium finish

Points
Throughout the history of the 500cc/MotoGP World Championship, the points-scoring positions and the number of points awarded to each position have varied – see the List of FIM World Championship points scoring systems for details.

Total points

Total races finished in the points

Most consecutive points finishes

Most consecutive points scored

Most points in a season

Most career points without being World Champion

World Champions with fewest career points

Most seasons with a points finish

Most consecutive seasons with a points finish

Pole positions

Total pole positions

Percentage pole positions

Percentage pole positions (minimum 15 races)

Most pole positions in a season

Most consecutive pole positions

Most pole positions at the same Grand Prix

Most consecutive pole positions at the same Grand Prix

Youngest polesitters
(only the first pole position for each rider is listed)

Oldest polesitters
(only the last pole position for each rider is listed)

Most seasons with a pole position

Most consecutive seasons with a pole position

Fastest laps

Total fastest laps

Most fastest laps in a season

Most consecutive fastest laps

Most seasons with a fastest lap scored

Most consecutive seasons with a fastest lap scored

Multiple rider records

Pole and win in same race

Pole, win and fastest lap in same race
This is sometimes referred to as a "hat-trick".

Riders' Championships

Total championships

Most consecutive championships

Most World Championship seasons before first title

Youngest World Championship winners
(at the moment they clinched the first/only title)

Oldest World Championship winners
(at the moment they clinched the last/only title)

Other

See also
 List of Grand Prix motorcycle racing rider records

Notes

References

Grand Prix motorcycle racing
Sports records and statistics
500cc/MotoGP